St Andrew Hubbard was a parish church in the Billingsgate ward of the  City of London. It was  destroyed in the Great Fire of London in 1666, and not rebuilt.

History
The church stood in the Billingsgate ward of the  City of London. The east end of the church adjoined Rope Lane, later known as Lucas Lane and then  Love Lane; it is now called Lovat Lane.  It took its name from Hubert, a mediaeval benefactor. Its parish records are among the most detailed in the United Kingdom, and have been extensively researched.

The church was repaired and "richly beautified" in 1630, at a cost to the parishioners of more than £600. It was destroyed in the Great Fire of London in 1666 and not rebuilt. Instead the parish was united with that of  St Mary-at-Hill  and the site sold to the city authorities. Part of the land was used to widen the roadway, and the rest to build the Royal Weigh House. A parish vestry was built at the east end of the weighhouse, beneath which were "a Portico,  Publick Stocks, a Cage, and a Little Room".

A Parish boundary mark can be found in nearby Philpot Lane. Today Citibank occupies part of the site.

References
 

Churches destroyed in the Great Fire of London and not rebuilt
Churches in the City of London
1666 disestablishments in England